The J.V. Martin K.III Kitten, also known as the J.V. Martin K.III Scout, was marketed as an "altitude fighter" for the U.S. Army. It is considered the first aircraft in the United States with retractable landing gear.

Design and development
James V. Martin was a consultant to the U.S. Air service, and an associate to General Billy Mitchell. He held patents on aerospace technologies including the retractable landing gear and once held the World's speed record of 70 mph in an airplane. The Kitten design was too late for the war effort, it could not go into production before the end of World War I.

The aircraft featured manual retractable landing gear. The wheels used flexible spokes for shock absorption. When viewed from the side, the wing supports formed a letter "K" shape. The fuselage was all wood with plywood and fabric covering. The aircraft featured air tanks, and electrical power for flightsuit heating.

Operational history
In 1918, the aircraft was delivered to McCook Field where it was considered structurally unsound. Martin appealed to Congress in 1920 to no avail. In 60 test flights at Dayton, Ohio, the high altitude aircraft could only reach 295 ft of altitude. The prototype K.III Kitten was donated to the National Air and Space Museum in 1924.

Variants
The J.V. Martin K.IV was a model III with a more powerful 60 hp Lawrance engine and floats. 3 were built and sold to the U.S. Navy.

Specifications

References

1910s United States fighter aircraft
Aircraft first flown in 1919